Eupithecia matrona is a moth in the family Geometridae. It is found in western China (Qinghai, Gansu).

The wingspan is about 24–25 mm. The forewings are light greyish brown. The hindwings are also light greyish brown, but paler.

References

Moths described in 2004
matrona
Moths of Asia